Straža is a village in Serbia. It is situated in the Vršac municipality, in the South Banat District, Vojvodina province.

Name
In Serbian, the village is known as Straža (Стража), in Romanian as Straja, in Hungarian as Strázsa (later Temesőr), and in German as Lagerdorf.

History

Straža was established in the winter of 1716–17 by the Austrian imperial army as a base for soldiers sent to protect the town of Palanka from advancing Ottoman troops. After the army was recalled, several soldiers and artisans remained to form the settlement of Lagerdorf. The historian Borovski confirms that after the Ottomans were expelled, the settlement was colonized by Germans. By 1734, the settlement already had its own post office and a German mill was built near the Karaš River.

By 1744, Romanian settlers began to move into the settlement mostly from the Oltenia province in lesser Wallachia. By 1782, the settlement's population swelled to over 1,000 people, 917 of which were Eastern Orthodox. It was controlled by the Ottomans between 1787–88.

In October 1848, Serbian troops from Alibunar were stationed in the settlement because of advancing Hungarian troops. The Serb army was nearly destroyed by Hungarian troops under the leadership of the general Jovan Damjanić (a Serb by origin).

In 1880, Lagerdorf was renamed Straža (Straja in Romanian) and was referred to as Temes-Strazsa by the Hungarians in 1894 and Temesor in 1911. Name Straža itself is of Serbian origin (meaning "sentinel").

In 1854, the settlement's population was 1,195, in 1869, it reached 1,242, in 1880, the population was 1,510, in 1900 it was 1,606, and by 1910 the population was 1,678. During World War I, 70 soldiers from Straža lost their lives. In 1921, a total of 1,482 people lived in the settlement: 1,389 Romanians, 17 Serbs, 14 Hungarians, 10 Germans, and 52 others of various nationalities.

Historical population

1961: 1,393
1971: 1,254
1981: 1,207
1991: 1,107
2002: 693
2011: 538

Ethnic groups (2002 census) 
The village has a Romanian majority and its population numbering 538 people (2011 census).

Romanians = 557 (80.37%)
Serbs = 52 (7.5%)
Roma = 35 (5.05%)
Hungarians = 16 (2.3%)
others.

Church 
The Eastern Orthodox Church in Straža was originally built in 1854 but was not in use until 1856 when the priest Stefan Popović was present. The interior was restored in 1935 by Karl and Josef Löffler while Ion Mităr was cleric. Jon Mităr served in Straža as chaplain until May 1943. He was succeeded  by Ioan Ivașcu in June of the same year. From 1948 until 1978, Corneliu Șdicu served as chaplain. Moise Janeș became chaplain in 1979 and still serves today.

See also
List of places in Serbia
List of cities, towns and villages in Vojvodina

References
Slobodan Ćurčić, Broj stanovnika Vojvodine, Novi Sad, 1996.

External links

 Straža's Web Site 

Populated places in Serbian Banat
Populated places in South Banat District
Vršac
Romanian communities in Serbia